The Devil Horse is a 1932 American Pre-Code movie serial starring Harry Carey, Frankie Darro and Noah Beery, Sr. that was distributed by Mascot Pictures. This is regarded as the best of the three serials Harry Carey made in the early 1930s, the other two being Last of the Mohicans and The Vanishing Legion. Frankie Darro had co-starred with Carey previously in The Vanishing Legion. Lane Chandler played the murdered ranger Elliott Norton, uncredited.

Plot
Hank Canfield (Noah Beery), leader of a gang of horse thieves, attempts to steal a wild racehorse called El Diablo. The crooks bungle the job, but in making their escape, they kill a Ranger named Elliott Norton (Lane Chandler). The ranger's older brother Bob (Harry Carey) sets out to bring his brother's killers to justice, not realizing the apparently respectable Canfield is the guilty party. A young mute orphan referred to as the Wild Boy (Frankie Darro) is the only one in town who knows who the killer is, and Bob Norton attempts to communicate with the child to draw the secret out of him. Meanwhile, the horse thieves make further attempts to kidnap the prized racehorse.

Cast
Harry Carey as Bob Norton, aka Roberts 
Noah Beery, Sr. as Canfield 
Frankie Darro as The Wild Boy 
Greta Granstedt as Linda Weston 
Barrie O'Daniels as Lee Weston 
Edward Peil Sr. as The Sheriff
Jack Mower as Mark Adams 
Al Bridge as Curley Bates 
Lew Kelly as The father
Lane Chandler as Elliott Norton (uncredited)
 Apache, King of the Wild Horses as "El Diablo"

Release

Home media
The Devil Horse was released on DVD by Alpha Video on June 24, 2008. All 12 chapters are on one disc.

Chapter titles
 Untamed
 Chasm of Death
 Doom Riders
 Vigilante Law
 The Silent Call
 Heart of the Mystery
 Battle of the Strong
 The Missing Witness
 The Showdown
 The Death Trap
 Wild Loyalty
 The Double Decoy
Source:

See also
 List of film serials by year
 List of film serials by studio

References

External links

1932 films
1930s English-language films
1932 Western (genre) films
American black-and-white films
Mascot Pictures film serials
Films directed by Otto Brower
American Western (genre) films
Films produced by Nat Levine
Films with screenplays by George H. Plympton
1930s American films